The Nor Yauyos-Cochas Landscape Reserve is a protected area in Peru located in the Lima Region, Yauyos Province and in the Junín Region, Jauja Province. It lies with the Peruvian Yungas and Central Andean wet puna ecoregions.

Sima Pumaqucha, one of the deepest caves of South America, and Qaqa Mach'ay, the highest surveyed cave in the world, are situated in the reserve.

Archaeological sites 
Some of the archaeological sites within the reserve are Khuchi Mach'ay,  Pirqa Pirqa, Quchawasi (Cochashuasi), Qutu Qutu (Coto Coto) and Wamanmarka (Huamanmarca).

Gallery

See also 
 Paryaqaqa mountain range
 Lake Pumacocha (Lima) 
 Lake Cochabamba

References

See also 
 Natural and Cultural Peruvian Heritage

External links 
 www.parkswatch.org / Nor Yauyos-Cochas Landscape Reserve
 www.enjoyperu.com / Nor Yauyos-Cochas Landscape Reserve (Spanish)

Geography of Lima Region
Geography of Junín Region
Protected areas established in 2001
Landscape reserves of Peru
2001 establishments in Peru